The Sportsman was a daily sports newspaper published in the United Kingdom for seven months during 2006.

History
It was launched on 22 March and intended to complement Dennis Publishing's gambling magazine, Total Gambler.  It was the brainchild of editor-in-chief Charlie Methven, and the UK's first new national daily newspaper since the launch of the Daily Sport in 1991. It claimed to be a one-stop shop for the modern punter, offering news, views and tips on sport, racing and anything else bookmakers give odds on.

Demise
Sales reached 22,333 in May, some way short of its target break-even figure of 40,000.  The publisher went into administration in July.  A subsequent attempt to refinance its debt failed, and the paper ceased publication on 5 October.

References
 
 
 
 
 
  
 

Gambling publications
Sports newspapers published in the United Kingdom
Defunct newspapers published in the United Kingdom
Publications established in 2006
Publications disestablished in 2006
2006 in British sport
2006 establishments in the United Kingdom